Yang Jinlong may refer to:

 Yang Chin-long (born 1953), Taiwanese economist, Governor of the Central Bank of the Republic of China
 Yang Jinlong (chemist) (born 1966), Chinese chemist, Vice President of the University of Science and Technology of China